Jokūbas Šernas  (14 June 1888 – 31 July 1926) was a Lithuanian attorney, journalist, teacher and banker, one of the twenty signatories to the Act of Independence of Lithuania.

Born in Biržai, he studied law at the University of St. Petersburg, graduating in 1914. After he returned to Lithuania, he worked in Vilnius for various political causes centering on independence and taught at the Vilnius Gymnasium, as well as editing Lietuvos žinios (Lithuanian News). He helped organize the Vilnius Conference and was elected to the Council of Lithuania, signing the Act in 1918.

After independence Šernas served in the organizations working to establish democratic institutions in the new state, including the Ministry of the Interior. He founded and edited the journal Savivaldybės (Self Government) and was appointed director of the Commerce and Industry Bank.

He was the father of the actor Jacques Sernas but died in Kaunas in 1926, only a year after his son was born in 1925. He is buried in the cemetery of Nemunėlio Radviliškis

References

" Šernas, Jokūbas". Encyclopedia Lituanica V: 123. (1970-1978). Ed. Simas Sužiedėlis. Boston, Massachusetts: Juozas Kapočius. LCCN 74-114275.

1888 births
1926 deaths
Lithuanian jurists
Lithuanian bankers
Lithuanian journalists
Ministers of Internal Affairs of Lithuania
Members of the Council of Lithuania
Saint Petersburg State University alumni
Lithuanian independence activists
20th-century journalists